The Grand Junction Jackalopes are an independent baseball team of the Pioneer League, which is not affiliated with Major League Baseball (MLB) but is an MLB Partner League. They are located in Grand Junction, Colorado, and play their home games at Suplizio Field. They were formerly named the Rockies, after the Colorado Rockies, who were their major league affiliate from 2001 to 2020 prior to the league becoming independent.

Franchise history 

Silverbow had attempted to sell the franchise in 1994 to investors from California, but the deal fell through when it was determined that Silverbow owned a lesser percentage of the franchise than it had purported to own.

Following the  season, the team relocated to Casper, Wyoming as the Casper Rockies (and was renamed the Ghosts before the  season) and affiliated with Colorado.

On January 13, 2011, Casper Professional Baseball Club, LLC announced the sale of the team to Monfort Investment Group, a group headed by Colorado Rockies General Partners. 

October 17, 2011, Grand Junction city officials unanimously approved a lease agreement to the team, making Suplizio Field home to the newly renamed Grand Junction Rockies.

In conjunction with a contraction of Minor League Baseball in 2021, the Pioneer League was converted from an MLB-affiliated Rookie Advanced league to an independent baseball league and granted status as an MLB Partner League, with Grand Junction continuing as a member.

On November 4, 2022, the team officially announced their new name of the Grand Junction Jackalopes.

Roster

Notable players
Butte Copper Kings, Casper Rockies and Casper Ghosts players who have made appearances on Major League teams:

Cecil Fielder
Omar Vizquel
Rich Aurilia
Jake Bird 
Julio Franco
Bobby Jenks
Robb Nen
Roger Pavlik
Francisco Rodríguez
Kevin Seitzer
Mike Napoli
Alfredo Amézaga
Andy Barkett
Andy Beene
Mark Brandenburg
Mickey Callaway
Juan Castillo
Bryan Clutterbuck
Cris Colón
John Davis
Tom Edens
Joey Eischen
Trevor Enders
Scott Eyre
Monty Fariss
Jeff Frye
Benji Gil
Donald Harris
Todd Helton
Matt Hensley
Dion James
Kerry Lacy
Terrell Lowery
Bill Lyons
David Manning
Rob Maurer
Brian Meadows
Ángel Miranda
Alberto Árias
Darren Clarke
Manuel Corpas
Dexter Fowler
Jonathan Herrera
Ubaldo Jiménez
Franklin Morales
Josh Newman
Jayson Nix
Jordan Pacheco
Alex Serrano
Ryan Shealy
Seth Smith
Ian Stewart
Ryan Speier
Jermaine Van Buren
Eduardo Villacis
Everth Cabrera
Jhoulys Chacín
Matt Daley
Juan Morillo
David Patton
Esmil Rogers
Pedro Strop
Mike Timlin
Eric Young, Jr.
Wilin Rosario
Ryan Mattheus
Juan Nicasio
Jon Gray
Trevor Story
 Nolan Arenado

References

External links 
 
 Statistics from Baseball-Reference

Professional baseball teams in Colorado
Colorado Rockies minor league affiliates
Anaheim Angels minor league affiliates
Tampa Bay Devil Rays minor league affiliates
Texas Rangers minor league affiliates
Kansas City Royals minor league affiliates
Milwaukee Brewers minor league affiliates
Pioneer League (baseball) teams
Baseball teams established in 2012
2012 establishments in Colorado
Grand Junction, Colorado